Peter Denzel (born 24 March 1939) is a sailor from Austria. Denzel represented his country at the 1972 Summer Olympics in Kiel. Denzel took 17th place in the Soling with Uli Strohschneider as helmsman and Robert Haschka as fellow crew member.

References

Living people
1939 births
Austrian male sailors (sport)
Sailors at the 1972 Summer Olympics – Soling
Olympic sailors of Austria